The 1908 United States presidential election in Texas took place on November 3, 1908. Voters chose 18 representatives, or electors to the Electoral College, who voted for president and vice president.

Texas overwhelmingly voted for the Democratic nominee, former U.S. Representative William Jennings Bryan, over the Republican nominee, Secretary of War William Howard Taft. Bryan won Texas by a landslide margin of 51.62%.

Bryan had previously won Texas against William McKinley in both 1896 and 1900. With 73.97 percent of the popular vote, Texas would also prove to be Bryan's fourth strongest victory in terms of percentage in the popular vote only after South Carolina, Mississippi and Louisiana.

Results

See also
 United States presidential elections in Texas

References

Texas
1908
1908 Texas elections